Nick Arvin is an American engineer and writer.

Early life and education
Arvin was born in North Carolina and raised in Michigan. He graduated from the University of Michigan and Stanford University with degrees in mechanical engineering. He is also a graduate of the Iowa Writers' Workshop. He has worked in forensic engineering and accident reconstruction.

Writing career
He has published 4 books of fiction: The Reconstructionist, Articles of War, Mad Boy, and In the Electric Eden: Stories.

He has also had work published in The New Yorker.

Personal life
He currently resides in Denver, Colorado.

Awards
Articles of War was listed by Esquire magazine as one of the best books of the year and was awarded the Rosenthal Award from the American Academy of Arts and Letters, the W. Y. Boyd Literary Award for Excellence in Military Fiction from the American Library Association, and the Colorado Book Award. He is also the recipient of a Michener Fellowship and an Isherwood Foundation Grant.

In 2008, Arvin was awarded a Literature Fellowship by the National Endowment for the Arts.

Bibliography
 In the Electric Eden: Stories.  New York: Penguin Books, 2003.   
 Articles of War.  New York: Doubleday, 2005.   
 The Reconstructionist.  New York: Harper Perennial, 2012.   
 Mad Boy: An Account of Henry Phipps in the War of 1812. Europa Editions, 2018.

References

External links
 Official website

Year of birth missing (living people)
Living people
21st-century American engineers
21st-century American male writers
21st-century American non-fiction writers
21st-century American novelists
American male non-fiction writers
American male novelists
American military writers
Iowa Writers' Workshop alumni
The New Yorker people
Novelists from Michigan
Stanford University School of Engineering alumni
University of Michigan College of Engineering alumni